Manfred Lenz (born 21 November 1947) is a retired German football striker.

References

1961 births
Living people
German footballers
Hertha BSC players
FC 08 Homburg players
Association football forwards
Bundesliga players
2. Bundesliga players
German football managers
FC 08 Homburg managers
SV Alsenborn players
West German footballers
People from Donnersbergkreis
Footballers from Rhineland-Palatinate